Warriormine is an unincorporated community located in McDowell County, West Virginia, United States. Warriormine has its own post office with ZIP code 24894.

The community most likely was both named for nearby War Creek and Mine Tunnel.

References

Populated places in McDowell County, West Virginia
Neighborhoods in West Virginia
Coal towns in West Virginia